This is a list of Belgian football transfers for the 2020–21 winter transfer window. Only transfers involving a team from the professional divisions are listed, including the 16 teams in the 2020–21 Belgian First Division A and the 8 teams playing in the 2020–21 Belgian First Division B.

The winter transfer window opens on 1 January 2021, although a few transfers may take place before that date. The window closes at midnight on 31 January 2021 although outgoing transfers might still happen to leagues in which the window is still open. Players without a club may join teams, either during or in between transfer windows.

Transfers

References

Belgian
Transfers Winter
2020 Winter